Jonas Troest (born 4 March 1985) is a retired Danish professional footballer, who played as a centre-back. He played 25 matches for the Denmark under-21 national team. He is the older brother of footballer Magnus Troest.

Career
Troest started his senior career in 2002, with B 93 in the secondary Danish 1st Division league. In 2004, he moved to Silkeborg IF in the top-flight Danish Superliga championship. While at Silkeborg, he made his debut for the Denmark under-21 national team in September 2004. He moved abroad to play for Bundesliga club Hannover 96 in January 2006. In May 2006, he was selected to compete for the Denmark under-21 national squad at the 2006 European Under-21 Championship, where he played in all Denmark's three matches.

He signed with Süper Lig club Konyaspor in summer 2010.

He left AB in 2016.

References

External links
 

1985 births
Living people
Danish men's footballers
Association football defenders
Denmark youth international footballers
Denmark under-21 international footballers
Danish Superliga players
Bundesliga players
Boldklubben af 1893 players
Silkeborg IF players
Hannover 96 players
Odense Boldklub players
Konyaspor footballers
SønderjyskE Fodbold players
Akademisk Boldklub players
AB Tårnby players
Danish expatriate men's footballers
Danish expatriate sportspeople in Germany
Expatriate footballers in Germany
Footballers from Copenhagen